A gadget is a small technological object such as a device or an appliance that has a particular function, but is often thought of as a novelty.

Gadget may also refer to:

Media
 Gadget: Invention, Travel, & Adventure, also known as Gadget: Past as Future, a 1993 videogame
 The Gadget (novel), a 2001 young-adult novel by Paul Zindel

Characters
 GADGET, a robot character in the Doctor Who episode The Waters of Mars
 Gadget, a fictional robot from the Suikoden series of video games
 Gadget Hackwrench, a young female mouse in from the TV series Chip 'n Dale Rescue Rangers
 Gadgets, a series of machine-type monsters in the Yu-Gi-Oh! Trading Card Game
 Gary "Gadget" Flowers, a character in the This Is England series of films
 Inspector Gadget, the titular character of the animated series of the same name.

People
 Fad Gadget (born 1956), British avant-garde electronic musician and vocalist
 Little Nobody (also Funk Gadget), Australian musician and writer
 Next Time Gadget (born 1980), American electronic musician
 Reverend Gadget, steel fabrication artist, craftsman, prop builder, and television personality

Science
 The gadget, the code name given to the first bomb tested as part of the Trinity nuclear test

Technology
 GADGET, a free software for cosmological N-body/SPH simulations
 Gadget (computer science), a subset of a problem instance
 Gadget (machine instruction sequence), a sequence of computer instructions used in security exploit techniques
 Google Gadgets, dynamic web content that can be embedded on a web page
 Microsoft Gadgets, lightweight single-purpose applications

See also
 Gizmo (disambiguation)
 Widget (disambiguation)